Mahini is a surname. Notable people with the surname include:

Danial Mahini (born 1993), Iranian footballer
Hossein Mahini (born 1986), Iranian footballer

Iranian-language surnames